Family with sequence similarity 104, member A is a protein that in humans is encoded by the FAM104A gene. The orthologous gene in mice is also known as D11Wsu99e.

Model organisms

Model organisms have been used in the study of FAM104A function. A conditional knockout mouse line, called D11Wsu99etm2a(EUCOMM)Wtsi was generated as part of the International Knockout Mouse Consortium program — a high-throughput mutagenesis project to generate and distribute animal models of disease to interested scientists.

Male and female animals underwent a standardized phenotypic screen to determine the effects of deletion. Twenty four tests were carried out on mutant mice, and a significant abnormality was observed in male homozygote's peripheral blood lymphocytes. Specifically, they displayed a decreased B cell number and a corresponding increase in granulocyte number.

References
 

Human proteins
Genes mutated in mice